Svetlana Parkhomenko and Larisa Savchenko were the defending champions but they competed with different partners that year, Parkhomenko with Leila Meskhi and Savchenko with Natasha Zvereva.

Meskhi and Parkhomenko lost in the second round to Belinda Cordwell and Dianne van Rensburg.

Savchenko and Zvereva lost in the semifinals to Eva Pfaff and Elizabeth Smylie.

Pfaff and Smylie won in the final 6–3, 7–6 against Cordwell and van Rensburg.

Seeds
Champion seeds are indicated in bold text while text in italics indicates the round in which those seeds were eliminated.

Draw

Final

Top half

Bottom half

References
 1988 Pilkington Glass Championships Doubles Draw

Eastbourne International
1988 WTA Tour